Olds-Didsbury Airport  is located next to Alberta Highway 2A,  south of the Town of Olds, Alberta and  north of the Town of Didsbury, Alberta, Canada.

See also
Olds (Netook) Airport

References

Registered aerodromes in Alberta
Mountain View County